Emile Santiago (February 21, 1899 –June 23, 1995) was an American costume designer who won an Oscar for the film The Robe in the category Best Costume design-Color during the 1953 Academy Awards, that she won along with Charles LeMaire.

Filmography
The Big Country (1958)
Strange Lady in Town (1955)
The Robe (1953)
Salome (1953)
Androcles and the Lion (1952)

References

External links

 Emile Santiago costume design drawings, circa 1952, Margaret Herrick Library, Academy of Motion Picture Arts and Sciences

1899 births
1995 deaths
Best Costume Design Academy Award winners
American costume designers
People from Bloomsburg, Pennsylvania